The Thai lunar calendar (literally, Specific days according to lunar norms), or Tai calendar, is a lunisolar Buddhist calendar. It is used for calculating lunar-regulated holy days. Based on the SuriyaYatra, with likely influence from the traditional Hindu Surya Siddhanta, it has its own unique structure that does not require the Surya Siddhanta to calculate. Lunisolar calendars combine lunar and solar calendars for a nominal year of 12 months. An extra day or an extra 30-day month is intercalated at irregular intervals.

Legal versus religious calendar
The Thai solar calendar, Thailand's version of the Gregorian calendar, replaced the patithin chanthrakhati in AD 1888 / 2431 BE for legal and commercial purposes. In both calendars, the four principal lunar phases determine Buddhist Sabbaths (Uposatha), obligatory holy days for observant Buddhists. Significant days also include feast days.

Note that the Thai and the Chinese lunar calendars do not directly correspond. Thai Chinese likewise observe their Sabbaths and traditional Chinese holidays according to solar terms, two of which correspond to one lunar phase. These also move with respect to the solar calendar, and so it is common for Thai calendars to incorporate both Thai and Chinese lunar calendar-based events.

Mundane astrology also figures prominently in Thai culture, so modern Thai birth certificates include lunar calendar dates and the appropriate Thai Zodiacal animal year-name for Thai Hora. The Thai Zodiac is similar to the Chinese, though the Dragon is replaced by the Naga (งูใหญ่), and in Northern Thailand the Pig is occasionally replaced with an Elephant.

Years

To keep the years in sync with the seasons, Thai lunar years may add a day to the 7th month or repeat the 8th month. Therefore, years may have one of three lengths – 354, 355 or 384 days – yet retain a nominal length of twelve months.

The 354-day-long years consist of 12 "normal months", and such a year is called a "normal-month year".
The 355-day-long years add an extra day to the normally 29-day-long 7th month; such a year is called an "extra-day year".

The 384-day-long years repeat the 30-day-long 8th month, thus keeping the month count at 12. Nevertheless, a year of 384 days is called an "extra-month year".

New year
The Thai lunar calendar does not mark the beginning of a new year when it starts a new 1-to-12 count, which occurs most frequently in December.

The Thai solar calendar determines a person's legal age and the dates of secular holidays, including the civil new year and the three days of the traditional Thai New Year, which begin the next Twelve-year animal cycle. Should the holidays fall on a weekend, it also accommodates these as well as some of the principal lunar festivals with a compensatory day off.

Twelve-year animal cycle 

13 April of the solar calendar occasions the beginning of the traditional Thai New Year (Songkran) and is the day that a year assumes the name of the next animal in the twelve-year animal cycle; Thai Chinese communities may observe the name-change earlier in accordance with the Chinese New Year.

The Thai names of the months were borrowed from Khmer, which were in turn borrowed from an unknown Vietic language.

Months 
In the modern Thai calendar, months (meaning "month" or "Lunation") are defined by lunar cycles. Successive months (or lunations) are numbered from 1 to 12 within the Thai year. As in other Buddhist calendars, these months have names that derive from Sanskrit, but for the most part are only known by Thai astrologers.

Two successive lunations take slightly more than 59 days. The Thai lunar calendar approximates this interval with "normal-month" pairs that are alternately 29 and 30 days long. 29-day "hollow months" are odd-numbered; 30-day "full months" are even-numbered.

To keep the beginning of the month in sync with the new moon, from time to time either the normally "hollow" Month 7 takes an extra day, or an extra "full" Month 8 follows a normal "full" Month 8.

Months 1 and 2 are named in archaic alternate numbers, with the remainder being named in modern numbers.

Months 1 – 6 
Month 1,  "duean ai", begins the cycle of counting the months anew, most frequently in December, but does not signify the beginning of a new year. ai, an archaic word in Thai but not in other dialects, means first. An odd-numbered hollow month, it is 29 days long.

Month 2, "duean yi", (from archaic ญี่ meaning 2) is an even-numbered full month.

Months 3–6, "duean 3–6", use the modern reading of Thai numerals, as do all remaining months. Months 3–6, alternate between 29-day hollow months and 30-day full months.

Month 7 and athikawan 
Month 7, "duean 7", a hollow month is normally 29 days long in years of 354 days, but adds an extra day when required for 355-day-long years.

Month 8 
The eighth month, "duean 8", is a 30-day full month.

Month 8/8 "athikamat" 

Athikamat) is the extra month needed for a 384-day-long pi athikamat (extra-month year;). Month 8 repeats as เดือน ๘/๘ or Month 8/8, variously read as "duean paet thab paet" or "duean paet lang"

Months 9 – 12 
Months 9–12, "duean 9–12", complete the lunar cycle.

Month divisions
Months divide into two periods designated by whether they are waxing or waning:
Waxing : khang khuen, the period from new moon to full moon, is always 15 days long.
Waning : khang raem, the period from full moon to new moon, which is 14 days long in hollow months, except when Month 7 adds an extra day, and 15 days long in full months.

Weeks 

A week is called Sapda/Sappada. The term is defined by the Royal Institute Dictionary (RID) as a 7-day period beginning on Sunday and ending Saturday. When referring to lunations, however, it is the 7-, 8- or (rarely) 9-day interval between quartile lunar phases; that is, from one  to the next.

Days
While solar-calendar weekdays have names, lunar-calendar days number sequentially from 1 to 14 or 15 in two segments depending on whether the moon is waxing or waning. For example, "raem 15 kham duean 12 " means "Waning of the 15th Night of the 12th Lunar Month".

Kham  , evening, is considered to be the evening of the common day that begins and ends at midnight, rather than of a day that begins and ends at dusk. Past practice may have been different.

Named lunar days
Wan Phra  , Buddhist holy days
Wan Thamma Sawana   Buddhist Sabbath regularly fall on:
Khuen 8   first-quarter moon
Khuen 15   full moon; also called wan phen  day  [of] full [moon]. However, Wan Deuan Phen , the actual day of the full moon and khuen 15 kham do not always fall on the same day.
Raem 8   third-quarter moon
Raem 14 (15)    the last day of the lunar month; also called wan dap  day [moon is] quenched, [or goes] out.
Wan wai phra chan , called "Day [of] Respect [for] the Holy Moon", is the actual day the Harvest moon becomes full. It occurs on khuen 14 (15) kham duean 10  (Waxing 14 (15) Evening, Month 10.)

Holidays regulated by the moon

Buddhist Sabbaths, colloquially called , are the New, First-quarter, Full, and Third-quarter Moon-days. These are not normally days off, except for butcher, barber, and beautician shops that observe the Eight Precepts. Annual holidays and seasonal festivals collectively are called .

The table shows the principal ones governed by the moon in yellow.

Work holidays prescribed by the government are called ; those regulated by the moon are red.

Weekends are normally days off; if a holiday normally observed by a day off falls on a weekend, the following Monday is a compensatory day off .

{|- style="background:lightyellow; color:green"
|-
! Mo.
! Day
! Event
! ไทย
! Comment
|-
| 3†
| 1x
| Chinese New Year
| 
| Most shops owned by Chinese-Thai close
|-
|- style="background:pink; color:black"
| 3
| 15x
| Magha Puja
| 
| Makha Bucha
|-
|- style="background:pink; color:black"
| 6
| 15x
| Vesak
| 
| Wisakha Bucha
|-
|- style="background:pink; color:black"
| 8‡
| 15x
| Asalha Puja
| 
| Asanha Bucha
|-
|- style="background:pink; color:black"
| 8‡
| 1n
| Wan Khao Phansa
| 
| Begin Rains Retreat, or "Buddhist Lent"
|-
| 10
| 15n
| Thetsakan Sat
| 
| The Vegetarian Festival now appears on calendars as thetsakan kin che kao wan, (begin) Nine-day Vegetarian Festival. Kin Jae  means (to vow) in the manner of Vietnamese or Chinese Buddhists to eat a strict vegetarian diet.
|-
| 11
| 15x
| Wan Ok Phansa
| 
| End Rains Retreat, or "Buddhist Lent"
|-
| 11
| 1n
| Thot Kathin
| 
| Presentation of Monk's Robes after Rains Retreat|-
| 12
| 15x
| Loi Krathong
| 
|  Note that Loi Krathong dates are based on the Lanna (Northern Thailand) Lunar Calendar which is two months later than the Thai Lunar Calendar. Loy Krathong is actually on the second month of the Lanna calendar which is the 12th month of the central Thai calendar.
|}
Notes:
 † The Chinese New Year uses different methods of determining intercalary months, so this festival sometimes occurs a month earlier or later.
 ‡ Month 8/8 in years with the extra month.

Thai year vocabulary
Thai orthography spells most native words phonetically, though there is no definitive system for
transcription into Roman letters. Here, native Thai words are immediately followed by a vocabulary entry in this pattern:Phonetic Thai (Thai phonetic respelling, if different) [Comment] definition; variant definitions.
Example:Thai  ไทย (ไท)  [Archaic] free, frank; Thai race, language, alphabet ; citizen of Thailand.

Sanskrit loan words follow different rules [the way English grammatical rules vary for words of Greek and Latin origin  ('ph-' in 'phonetic' being pronounced /f/, for example.)] Entered below in order of first appearance, these vocabulary entries are in this pattern:Sanskrit  สันสกฤต (สันสะกฺริด /san-sa-krit/)  :
Literally means "self-made" or "self-done", or "cultured" in a modern usage (which implies the language of cultured persons); Sanskrit alphabet, language, writing; [presumed] compound of
 san สัน (-/son/) derived from the word, "saṃ" meaning "self, together, with"
 skrit สกฤต (สะกฺริต /sa-krit/)  derived from the word "(s)kar" meaning "do or make".
 Chanthrakhati จันทรคติ  (จันทฺระคะติ) : "Lunar norms", Lunar Calendar; compound of
 Chanthra- จันทร- (จันทฺระ) : Chan จันทร์ (จัน)  moon, lunar +
 Kati คติ (คะติ) : ways, principles, norms
 Patithin ปฏิทิน (ปะติทิน) : Calendar; compound of
  Pati- ปฏิ- (ปะติ-) : anti-, re-, for, specific +
  -thin (-ทิน) : [from Sanskrit dina] : day.
 patithin means for days, specific days or fixed days
 Patitin Chanthakhati  ปฏิทินจันทรคติ (ปะติทินจันทระคะติ) :  "Specific days according to lunar norms", Lunar Calendar
 Suriyakhati สุริยคติ (สุริยะคะติ) : Solar norms, Solar Calendar; compound of
 Suriya สุริย or สุริยะ : Athit อาทิตย์, the sun, Sol  +
 Khati คติ (คะติ) : ways, principles, norms
 Prokkatimat ปรกติมาส  (ปฺรกกะติมาด) : normal month; compound of
 Prokkati ปรกติ (ปฺรกกะติ) : pakati ปกติ (ปะกะติ) ordinary, usual, normal +
 Mat มาส  (มาด) : duean (เดือน) month.
 Athikamat อธิกมาส (อะทิกะมาด) : month added in leap-month lunar years
 Athikawan อธิกวาร (อะทิกะวาน) : day added in leap-day lunar years; compound of
 Athika (Sanskrit: adhika) : additional +
 -wan วาร (Sanskrit: vāra) :  wan วัน day.Athikasurathin อธิกสุรทิน (อะทิกะสุระทิน) : day added to February in a solar leap year.

See also

 Public holidays in Thailand
 The Royal Institute of Thailand
 Thai solar calendar
 Thai 6-hour clock
 Time in Thailand
 Traditional Burmese calendar

References

 Further reading 
 
 Eade, J.C. The calendrical systems of mainland south-east Asia.  (Cited by Diller & Preecha)
 Sethaputra, So. New Model English - Thai Dictionary'',

External links
 Thai Time by Anthony Diller  – last changed 10 January 2002.
 How Chula Sakarat Dates Work in Thailand: article for stamp collectors recovered 20 December 2007.
 Thai Lunar Calendar (BE.2300-2584)  (Thai Language)

Lunar calendar
Lunisolar calendars
Specific calendars
Calendars